Anthodiscus pilosus (chamisa, tahuari, botón caspi, botón huayo or tahuarí amarillo) is a plant species in the genus Anthodiscus found in Amazonian Colombia and Peru.

Anthodiscus pilosus is added to some versions of the hallucinogenic drink Ayahuasca.

References

External links

Ayahuasca
pilosus
Plants described in 1947
Taxa named by Adolpho Ducke